Conrich is a hamlet in southern Alberta under the jurisdiction of Rocky View County.

It has been anticipated that the hamlet will eventually be annexed by Calgary. However, Calgary's 2007 annexation did not move its eastern limits closer to the hamlet.

Conrich got its start as a flag station for the Grand Trunk Pacific Railway. A flag station was exactly that: passengers wanting to board had to flag the train down. The land for the site was obtained from W.F. Birch. The railroad reached here in 1913, and the name comes from the surnames of two real estate developers, Connacher and Richardson . The Canadian National Railway took over the line in 1918. That year, a 30,000 bushel grain elevator was also built. A post office operated at this site from August 15, 1925 to December 12, 1960.

Demographics 

The population of Conrich according to the 2018 municipal census conducted by Rocky View County is 21, a decrease from its 2013 municipal census population of 26.

See also 
List of communities in Alberta
List of hamlets in Alberta

References 

Karamitsanis, Aphrodite (1992). Place Names of Alberta – Volume II, Southern Alberta, University of Calgary Press, Calgary, Alberta.
Read, Tracey (1983). Acres and Empires – A History of the Municipal District of Rocky View, Calgary, Alberta.

Calgary Region
Designated places in Alberta
Hamlets in Alberta
Rocky View County